Ochrodota marina is a moth of the subfamily Arctiinae first described by Schaus in 1910. It is found in Costa Rica.

References

Phaegopterina